The Maningory Falls is a waterfall of 90 meters in the region of Analanjirofo in Madagascar.

They are situated on the Maningory River at 20 km from Imerimandroso.

References

Waterfalls of Madagascar
Analanjirofo